Guercif is a province in the west of Oriental, Morocco. Its formed in 2009. The provincial capital is at Guercif.

Administrative divisions
Guercif province is divided into 1 municipality (Urban commune) and 9 communes (Rural communes).

Municipality
 Guercif

Rural commune
 Assebbab
 Barkine
 Houara Oulad Raho
 Lamrija
 Mazguitam
 Oulad Bourima
 Ras Laksar
 Saka
 Taddart

References

 
Tétouan